Unc-13 homolog A (C. elegans) is a protein that in humans is encoded by the UNC13A gene.

Function 
This gene encodes a member of the UNC13 family. UNC13A plays a role in vesicle maturation during exocytosis as a target of the diacylglycerol second messenger pathway. It is involved in neurotransmitter release by acting in synaptic vesicle priming prior to vesicle fusion and participates in the activity-dependent refilling of readily releasable vesicle pool. In Drosophila melanogaster, the protein has been shown to define the vesicle release site by regulating the coupling distance between synaptic vesicles and calcium channels in cooperation with another isoform, UNC13B. It is particularly important in most glutamatergic-mediated synapses as well as GABA-mediated synapses. It plays a role in dendrite formation by melanocytes and in secretory granule priming in insulin secretion.

Protein structure 
Several conserved domains have been found in UNC13A. These conserved domains include three C2 domains. One C2 domain is centrally located, another is at the carboxyl end, and there is a third. In addition, there is one C1 domain, as well as Munc13 homology domains 1 (MHD1) and 2 (MHD2).

Subcellular location 
UNC13A is localized to the active zone of presynaptic density. It is translocated to the plasma membrane in response to phorbol ester binding.

Interaction

UNC13A has been shown to interact with:

STX1A,
STX1B1,
DOC2A,
BSN,
RIMS1,
RIMS2,
ERC2, and
RAB3A.

Clinical significance 
Single nucleotide polymorphisms in this gene may be associated with sporadic amyotrophic lateral sclerosis. This single nucleotide polymorphism has been discovered on chromosome 19. This variation of the single nucleotide involving UNC13A has also been implicated in frontotemporal dementia (FTD). Pathology of TDP-43 in both ALS and FTD results in a cryptic exon being expressed in UNC13A, which is exercerbated by the single nucleotide polymorphisms associated with ALS and FTD risk. This gene has also been associated with Alzheimer's disease (AD).

References

Further reading 

 
 
 
 
 
 
 

Human proteins